St. Georges Bay is a bay with shore on the Nova Scotia peninsula and Cape Breton Island, Canada, thus comprising a sub-basin of the Gulf of St. Lawrence.

St. Georges Bay marks the northern end of the Strait of Canso, one of three outlets for the Gulf of St. Lawrence.  It is a busy coastal shipping route on account of the Canso Canal; the Canadian Coast Guard maintains a Vessel Traffic Service (VTS) for the bay called "Canso Traffic" with separation schemes defining sea lanes on nautical charts.

Islands

Islands within the bay include from northeast to south to northwest:
Port Hood Island
Henry Island

Communities
Communities along the shoreline of St. Georges Bay include (from northwest to south to northeast):

Antigonish County
 Ballantynes Cove
 Cape George
 Lakevale
 Morristown
 Antigonish Harbour
 Antigonish
 Greenwold
 Williams Point
 Southside Antigonish Harbour
 Pomquet
 Bayfield
 Afton
 Tracadie
 Monastery
 Linwood
 Havre Boucher

Inverness County
 Craigmore
 Judique
 Judique North
 Harbourview
 Port Hood
 Port Hood Island

See also
 List of communities in Nova Scotia

References

Bays of Nova Scotia
Landforms of Inverness County, Nova Scotia
Landforms of Antigonish County, Nova Scotia